Marianne Lindsten-Thomasson (October 6, 1909 – May 26, 1979) was a Swedish physician and a pioneer member of the Medical Women's International Association. Lindsten-Thomasson was born into a farming family in Gothenburg, attended local gymnasia for her early education, and attended the University of Lund for her medical degree. She practiced medicine in various towns throughout Sweden.

References

1909 births
1979 deaths
Swedish women physicians
20th-century Swedish physicians
20th-century women physicians
20th-century Swedish women